The Vilakkithala Nair--Vilakkithalavan are a caste found in Kerala state, India. 

In Kerala they belong to OBC category. This caste is mentioned in the journal The Internal Structure of the Nayar Caste written by C. J. Fuller

They are an independent community nowadays. Their community organisation is Vilakkithala Nair Samajam

See also 
Nair
Nair subcast

References

Nair